Removals is a Polish Television drama from 2001, produced and broadcast by TVP1.

Plot 
The series follows the story of the Szczygłów family's removal firm, starting from New Year's Eve 1899. It seems that every time they do a removal, an object gets lost. Each episode is centred around this object. The series was intended to follow the Szczygłów family right up to the year 2000, however only episodes up to 1941 were ever produced.

Cast 
 Olaf Lubaszenko – Stanisław Szczygieł
 Łukasz Nowicki – Bogdan Szczygieł
 Krzysztof Banaszyk – Czesław Szczygieł
 Artur Janusiak – Mieczysław Szczygieł
 Anna Radwan – Teresa Szczygieł
 Wojciech Majchrzak – Wacław Szczygieł
 Edyta Jungowska – Helena Szczygieł
 Kinga Preis – Róża Żychniewicz-Szczygieł
 Leon Charewicz – Róża's father
 Maja Ostaszewska – Celina, wife of Mieczysława Szczygieł
 Mirosław Jękot – Bank Manager

Episodes 

Polish drama television series
2000s Polish television series
2001 Polish television series debuts
2001 Polish television series endings